Yoshihiko Amano (born 18 May 1971) is a retired Japanese basketball player.

References

1971 births
Living people
Akita Isuzu/Isuzu Motors Lynx/Giga Cats players
Japanese men's basketball players
Kagoshima Rebnise players
Nihon University Red Sharks men's basketball players
SeaHorses Mikawa players
Universiade medalists in basketball
Universiade silver medalists for Japan
Medalists at the 1995 Summer Universiade